Philip Medley (April 9, 1916 – October 3, 1997) was an American songwriter, notable for his composition "Twist and Shout", which he wrote along with Bert Russell. The song was made famous by both The Isley Brothers and The Beatles. Medley also wrote "A Million to One" and co-wrote, always with Russell, "If I Didn't Have a Dime" for Gene Pitney. He was also a co-writer of the song "Killer Joe", recorded by many bands including the Rocky Fellers, the Rivieras and the Kingsmen. In 1994, he played guitar for The Jeffersons at the Great Oak Farm Benefit. He wrote "Styrofoam Airplane".

His niece is singer Sharon Brown, who had a top ten hit on the Billboard Hot Dance Club Play chart in 1982 with the song "I Specialize in Love".

References

1916 births
1997 deaths
American male songwriters
20th-century American composers
20th-century American male musicians